Katsuki (written: 香月 or 勝生) is a Japanese surname. Notable people with the surname include:

, Japanese general
, Japanese voice actress
, Japanese baseball player
, Japanese baseball player

Fictional characters:
, a character in the manga series Comic Girls
, protagonist of the anime series Yuri on Ice

Katsuki (written: 勝己, 勝記, 克己, 克紀, 克貴 or 克樹) is also a masculine Japanese given name. Notable people with the name include:

, Japanese baseball player
, Japanese music critic
, Japanese swimmer
, Japanese baseball player
, Japanese footballer
, Japanese baseball player

Fictional characters:
, a character in the manga series My Hero Academia

Japanese-language surnames
Japanese masculine given names